Guye may refer to:

Guye District, in Tangshan, Hebei, China
Guye Peak, mountain in Washington State, United States
Denis Guye (1901–1986), English rower  
Philippe A. Guye (1862-1922), Swiss chemist
Charles-Eugène Guye (1866-1942), his brother, Swiss physicist
Guye (river), a river in Burgundy, France